Alima Moro (born 5 February 1983) is a Ghanaian footballer who plays as a goalkeeper.

Club career 
Moro started her soccer career in Bolgatanga-based Bolga Ghatel. In 2005, she left her home country, Ghana, to work in the Ghanaian embassy in Rome, Italy. Moro continued her career in the Serie C at Lighi. After just one season, she moved to Serie B side Marostica. In autumn 2007, she moved to Vicenza. There, Moro became a top performer, which got her a contract in Serie A at Trevignano in 2012. In Serie A, after a strong first season, she did not go beyond the reserve roles and returned to Serie C at the start of the 2013–14 season, playing for Laghi.

Having played for Udinese, Moro signed for Serie A side Tavagnacco for the 2018–19 season, as a third-choice goalkeeper.

International career 
Moro played for the Ghana women's national team, between 2011 and 2013. She was excluded from the national team in 2013 after accusing the former coach, A. K. Edusei, of corruption. Moro claimed in an interview with a Ghanaian daily that some of the national team players had their place. In December 2013, she returned to the national team.

Awards 
In the 2011–12 season, she was voted the best African footballer in Italy. On 23 October 2013 she was awarded the Ghana-Italy Excellence Awards in Brescia. In addition, she was awarded the best goalkeeper by the Ghana Football Association.

Futsal 
In addition to her football career, she played futsal for Fontanafredda Futsal Club Caffé dae Tose in Italy for two years.

References

External links 
 
 

1983 births
Living people
Women's association football goalkeepers
Ghanaian women's footballers
Ghanaian women's futsal players
Ghana women's international footballers
Ghanaian expatriate women's footballers
Ghanaian expatriate sportspeople in Italy
Expatriate footballers in Italy